The Caryatids is a science fiction novel by American writer Bruce Sterling, published in 2009. It tells the tale of the four Mihajlovic "sisters", clones of the widow of a Balkan warlord now exiled to an orbital space station. From the viewpoint of a "Dispensation" entrepreneur from Los Angeles, the sisters, raised in an environment of ubiquitous computing, may succeed in rescuing the Earth from environmental collapse (see environmental degradation, ecological collapse, pollution, and other related concepts)  in the year 2065.

The novel's locations include the Croatian island of Mljet, a Los Angeles threatened by a supervolcano, and the wastes of Central Asia.

Release details

External links
 
 Review by Cory Doctorow on Boing Boing
 Review by John Clute on Sci-Fi Wire

2009 American novels
2009 science fiction novels
Novels by Bruce Sterling
Novels set in Croatia
Novels set in Los Angeles
Del Rey books